HPPD may refer to:

 Hallucinogen persisting perception disorder, a perception disorder that can be caused by hallucinogenic drug use
 4-hydroxyphenylpyruvate dioxygenase, an enzyme found in almost all aerobic life forms and the primary target of some herbicides
One of those HPPD inhibitor herbicides, a 4-hydroxyphenylpyruvate dioxygenase inhibitor
 Hours per patient-day, a staffing goal to determine the number of clinicians needed to provide a certain standard of care to a set of patients